Back Home Again is the eighth studio album by American singer-songwriter John Denver, released in June 1974.

The multi-platinum album reached the top position on the Billboard 200 and contained the hit singles "Annie's Song" (#1 pop, No. 1 adult contemporary), and "Back Home Again" (#5 pop, No. 1 AC, No. 1 country). In addition, the studio versions of "Thank God I'm a Country Boy" and "Sweet Surrender" appear on this album.

The song "Grandma's Feather Bed" was written by banjoist Jim Connor, of the New Kingston Trio, based on a verse he wrote for his grandmother.  Denver first heard Connor playing the song in 1968.  Connor played on Denver's recording, and toured with the singer.

The song "The Music Is You" is a bonus track on the 1998 reissue of Rocky Mountain Christmas.

On the cover, John is shown with his then-wife Annie Martell.

Track listing 
All tracks written by John Denver, except where noted.

Personnel 
 John Denver – 6 & 12-string acoustic guitars, vocals
 Buddy Collette – clarinet
 Jim Gordon – drums, percussion
 Hal Blaine – drums, percussion
 Jim Connor – banjo, harmonica, vocals
 Julie Connor – vocals
 Glen Hardin – piano
 Lee Holdridge – orchestral arrangements
 David Jackson – bass
 Dick Kniss – bass
 John Sommers – banjo, acoustic guitar, mandolin, fiddle, backing vocals
 Steve Weisberg – acoustic guitar, dulcimer, dobro, backing vocals, arranger
 Don Wardell – Executive Producer
 Uncredited – piano, harmonica and organ on "Back Home Again", piano on "The Music is You"

Charts

Weekly charts

Year-end charts

Certifications

References

John Denver albums
1974 albums
Albums arranged by Lee Holdridge
Albums produced by Milt Okun
RCA Records albums